Between 1958 and 1965 the Decca record company made the first complete recording to be released of Richard Wagner's tetralogy, Der Ring des Nibelungen. Of the four component operas, there had been two previous studio recordings of Die Walküre, and a monaural radio recording of Götterdämmerung, which was released on record in 1956, but Decca's was the first Ring cycle planned and recorded for the gramophone. 

The recording of The Ring was conceived and produced by Decca's senior producer, John Culshaw, who engaged the Vienna Philharmonic, the conductor Georg Solti and leading Wagner singers including Birgit Nilsson, Wolfgang Windgassen, Hans Hotter and Gottlob Frick and, in roles they did not play onstage, well-known singers such as Kirsten Flagstad, Dietrich Fischer-Dieskau and Joan Sutherland. Culshaw and his engineering colleagues set out to capture on disc performances that would recreate in listeners' minds the drama that Wagner intended, compensating for the lack of visual images with imaginative production, making use of stereophonic techniques that became possible shortly before the start of the recording of the cycle.

The recordings were made in the Sofiensaal, Vienna, and issued on long-playing records. They were subsequently transferred to compact disc, in which form they have been continuously available since 1984. In polls for the BBC and Gramophone magazine the Decca Ring has been voted the greatest recording ever made, and it has won numerous honours, including Grand Prix du Disque and Grammy awards.

Background
Before the introduction of the long playing record in the late 1940s a complete recorded Ring was, as the producer John Culshaw put it, "unthinkable". Piecemeal excerpts had been issued on 78 rpm records, but a complete Ring would have required well over a hundred discs. The Decca record company began recording complete operas on LP in 1950, starting with Mozart's Die Entführung aus dem Serail, but it was believed throughout the industry that studio recordings of Wagner operas would be uneconomic. There were studio recordings of Die Meistersinger (Decca, 1950–51), and Tristan und Isolde (EMI, 1952), but in general it was thought that the only financially viable course was to tape live performances. Decca taped the 1951 and 1955 Ring cycles at the Bayreuth Festival, but the results were not considered satisfactory and were not issued at the time.

Culshaw believed that recording live performances was a second-best approach: he strongly advocated studio recordings in which the absence of the action and staging seen in the theatre would be redressed by imaginative production, "creating something like a 'theatre of the mind' which enabled the listener at home to get involved with Wagner's characters and the sweep of his great music-drama". For this, he believed, stereophonic recording, developed in the mid-1950s, was a key factor. Alan Rich, music critic of the New York Herald-Tribune, later concurred; having heard the Decca set of Götterdämmerung he wrote that few opera house productions were able to "rekindle the flame of the composer's plan", but in this recording "the most difficult to stage music drama, perhaps, in the entire repertory becomes a complete experience with no staging at all".

Decca hoped to record Die Walküre with Kirsten Flagstad as Brünnhilde, but she had retired from the operatic stage in the early 1950s, and when Culshaw invited her to record the opera in 1957 she declined to attempt a complete recording. The result was a set of Act I conducted by Hans Knappertsbusch with Flagstad as Sieglinde, and a separate one of the Todesverkundigung scene from Act II, and the whole of Act III, conducted by Solti with Flagstad as Brünnhilde. Both sets were recorded in the Sofiensaal, Vienna; the orchestra was the Vienna Philharmonic.

1958: Das Rheingold
By 1958 Decca, with its pre-eminent technical team −The Times called them "Decca's incomparable engineers" − was ready to embark on a complete studio recording of the four Ring operas. At Culshaw's instigation the company decided to begin with Das Rheingold, the first and shortest of the four. Culshaw engaged Solti, the Vienna Philharmonic and a roster of established Wagner singers. The cast included Flagstad in one of her last recorded performances, in the role of Fricka, which she had never sung on stage.

With the help of his engineering colleagues Gordon Parry and James Brown, Culshaw took exceptional pains to meet Wagner's musical requirements. Where the score calls for eighteen anvils to be hammered during two brief orchestral interludes – an instruction never followed in opera houses – Culshaw arranged for eighteen anvils to be hired and hammered, and Parry and Brown successfully captured the sound. There and elsewhere in the score the volume and clarity of sound were unprecedented on disc; the hi-fi aspects of the recording added to its appeal to the LP-buying public, as Culshaw recognised.

Cast

Wotan – George London 
Donner – Eberhard Wächter 
Froh – Waldemar Kmentt 
Loge – Set Svanholm 
Alberich – Gustav Neidlinger 
Mime – Paul Kuen 
Fasolt – Walter Kreppel 
Fafner – Kurt Böhme 

Fricka – Kirsten Flagstad
Freia – Claire Watson 
Erda – Jean Madeira 
Woglinde – Oda Balsborg 
Wellgunde – Hetty Plümacher 
Flosshilde – Ira Malaniuk 

Before the recording sessions, Culshaw's opposite number from EMI, Walter Legge, had remarked to Solti and Culshaw, "Rheingold? A beautiful work, but you won't sell fifty copies". His prediction was wrong: the LP set won enthusiastic praise from reviewers − The Gramophone described the recording quality as "stupendous" and called the set "wonderful … surpass[ing] anything done before" − and the recording sold in exceptional numbers. It entered the Billboard charts of best-selling LPs, "surrounded by Elvis Presley and Pat Boone, and without another classical recording in sight". But the progress of the Decca Ring was interrupted by contractual considerations. It was agreed by all concerned that for the other three Ring operas the participation of Birgit Nilsson as Brünnhilde was essential. Decca secured an exclusive contract with her, but she made it plain that her first priority was that Decca should record her in Tristan und Isolde. At around the same time she agreed to record Die Walküre for RCA Records, with whom Decca had a reciprocal agreement to share artists. These projects were both brought to fruition.  Although Die Walküre comes next after Das Rheingold in the tetralogy there was no appetite for another version of it so soon after RCA's, and so the next instalment in the Decca Ring was Siegfried, four years later.

1962: Siegfried
For Siegfried, Culshaw had under contract the leading Brünnhilde of the day and, in Hans Hotter, the leading Wotan/Wanderer, but casting the title role caused difficulty. The best-known singer of Siegfried at the time was Wolfgang Windgassen, but in Culshaw's view the performer's voice was showing "distinct signs of wear and tear" after more than ten years of singing Wagner's exceptionally demanding tenor roles. Culshaw found a younger singer, Ernst Kozub, for the role, but despite a fine voice Kozub failed to master the part and Culshaw turned to Windgassen, who stepped in at the last moment. Joan Sutherland undertook the role of the Woodbird (Waldvogel), far removed from her usual repertoire.

Cast

Siegfried – Wolfgang Windgassen
Mime – Gerhard Stolze
Brünnhilde – Birgit Nilsson
Wanderer (Wotan) – Hans Hotter
Alberich – Gustav Neidlinger
Fafner – Kurt Böhme
Erda – Marga Höffgen
Waldvogel – Joan Sutherland

The reviews were highly favourable. In The Gramophone Alec Robertson described the set as "the finest recording, as such, of opera that we have had so far, and one that embodies a magnificent performance of the great work". The Stereo Record Guide commented, "Solti's array of singers could hardly be bettered. Windgassen is at the very peak of his form, lyrical as well as heroic. Hotter has never been more impressive on records, his Wotan at last captured adequately. Stolze, Neidlinger and Böhme are all exemplary and, predictably, Joan Sutherland makes the most seductive of woodbirds". In High Fidelity Conrad L. Osborne called the set "Solti's finest recorded accomplishment to date", and added, "On to Götterdämmerung, please".

1964: Götterdämmerung
Culshaw wrote, "Nilsson, Windgassen and Gottlob Frick (Hagen) had to be in the cast or there was no point in starting", and they were duly cast. The only major role in the piece for which no singer was the obvious choice was Gunther, "an important but weak character", who Culshaw considered needed a strong singer to prevent him from being overshadowed. Dietrich Fischer-Dieskau agreed to sing the part. As Wagner called for steerhorns in Act II, Culshaw determined not to resort to the trombones usually played in the opera house, and commissioned a set of specially made steerhorns to produce the requisite "primitive, uncouth sound". Another, more controversial, attempt to represent Wagner's intentions was near the end of Act I, where the tenor Siegfried impersonates the baritone Gunther: the engineers subjected Windgassen's recorded voice to technological intervention to make it temporarily sound more like that of Fischer-Dieskau.

Cast

Brünnhilde – Birgit Nilsson
Siegfried – Wolfgang Windgassen
Waltraute – Christa Ludwig
Gunther – Dietrich Fischer-Dieskau
Gutrune – Claire Watson
Alberich – Gustav Neidlinger
Hagen – Gottlob Frick

First Norn – Helen Watts
Second Norn – Grace Hoffman
Third Norn – Anita Välkki
Woglinde – Lucia Popp
Wellgunde – Gwyneth Jones
Flosshilde – Maureen Guy

The reception of the set surpassed that given to its two predecessors. In The Gramophone, Robertson called it "the greatest achievement in gramophone history yet", and Desmond Shawe-Taylor described it as "a glorious achievement, which it will be difficult to equal and almost impossible to surpass". Andrew Porter called it a "landmark in gramophone history". In The Sydney Morning Herald, Roger Covell wrote of "the alchemy of Decca's magnificent, stunning, overwhelming new recording", and The New York Herald-Tribune'''s Rich wrote, "It is not only Wagner and Götterdämmerung that are justified by this new album. Suddenly the whole concept of recorded opera seems to make a new kind of sense.

1965: Die Walküre
For the last of the four Ring operas to be recorded for Decca's cycle, Nilsson and Hotter were cast as before. Windgassen did not wish to record Siegmund, and James King took the role. For Sieglinde, Culshaw cast Régine Crespin. Flagstad had died in 1962 and for Fricka, which she had played in Das Rheingold, Culshaw hoped to cast another former Brünnhilde, Astrid Varnay, but she declined and Christa Ludwig sang the part. Among the nine Valkyries were well-known singers including Helga Dernesch, Brigitte Fassbaender and Berit Lindholm.

Cast

Siegmund – James King 
Sieglinde – Régine Crespin 
Wotan – Hans Hotter 
Brünnhilde – Birgit Nilsson 
Hunding – Gottlob Frick 
Fricka – Christa Ludwig 

Gerhilde – Vera Schlosser 
Ortlinde – Helga Dernesch 
Waltraute – Brigitte Fassbaender 
Schwertleite – Helen Watts 
Helmwige – Berit Lindholm 
Siegrune – Vera Little 
Grimgerde – Marilyn Tyler 
Rossweisse – Claudia Hellmann

The set was well received, but the predominantly lyrical Die Walküre could not make the impact that Götterdämmerung had done; The Times commented, "After Götterdämmerung anything is an anticlimax. Solti has not attempted to overtrump, but to complete a satisfying Ring". Unlike its three predecessors it did not have the field to itself: Die Walküre was already available on disc in recordings conducted by Wilhelm Furtwängler and Erich Leinsdorf. Some reviewers felt that Hotter's Wotan, recorded late in his career, did not show him in his finest voice. (William Mann complained of "Hotter's foggy Wotan" as well as Crespin's "blowsy Sieglinde", although Robertson, acknowledging Hotter's "uncomfortable patches", felt that no other singer could "invest the part with such authority".)

1968: complete cycle
In 1968 Decca issued the cycle as an integral set on 19 LPs, together with a three-disc addendum consisting of the Siegfried Idyll and Kinder-Katechismus, both conducted by Solti, and an illustrated musical analysis of The Ring by the Wagner scholar Deryck Cooke. Porter commented, "The magnificent Decca Ring des Nibelungen has been generally hailed as the gramophone's greatest achievement". The recordings were later converted from analogue to digital for issue on CD. Decca made three digital transfers, the first in 1984, two years after CDs became generally available; later transfers, taking advantage of technological developments, were made in 1997 and 2012. Reviewing a 2015 reissue, Paul Robinson, writing in the journal of the Music Critics Association of North America, judged it to be the "benchmark recording … by which all others are judged". In polls for Gramophone (1999) and the BBC (2012) the Decca Ring'' was voted "the greatest recording of all time", and the phrase has been echoed by writers in the US and Australia. The complete cycle and its component parts have won numerous honours, including Grand Prix du Disque Mondiale and Grammy awards.

Notes, references and sources

Notes

References

Sources

Books

Web

Opera recordings
1950s classical albums
1960s classical albums
Decca Records albums
Recording, Solti